| tries = {{#expr:
 10 + 13 + 4 + 9 + 7 + 8 + 12 + 8 
 + 6 + 6 + 9 + 11 + 9 + 9 + 6 + 4
 + 4 + 9 + 6 + 5 + 7 + 2 + 8 + 9
 + 5 + 7 + 8 + 6 + 6 + 9 + 4 + 6
 + 7 + 3 + 9 + 5 + 9 + 5 + 6 + 7
 + 3 + 8 + 6 + 7 + 4 + 6 + 6 + 6
 + 6 + 5 + 5 + 7 + 6 + 9 + 8 + 5
 + 3 + 2 + 2 + 3 + 3 + 7 + 5 
 + 4 + 5 + 5 + 5 + 4 + 7 + 5 + 6
 + 8 + 3 + 5 + 4 + 3 + 8 + 4 + 5
 + 7 + 5 + 7 + 5 + 5 + 11 + 9 + 4
 + 3 + 4 + 5 + 2 + 1 + 11 + 2 + 7
 + 6 + 7 + 6 + 6 + 7 + 9 + 10 + 9
 + 5 + 9 + 7 + 4 + 6 + 6 + 11 + 7
 + 1 + 11 + 10 + 6 + 7 + 8 + 9 + 6
 + 3 + 8 + 6 + 3 + 15 + 3 + 8
 + 1 + 9 + 7 + 6 + 9 + 6 + 7 + 2
 + 5 + 8 + 7 + 6 + 7 + 5 + 4 + 15
 + 4 + 8 + 6 + 6 + 7 + 9 + 9 
 + 8 + 8 + 8 + 6 + 9 + 8 + 10 + 8 
 + 6 + 8 + 7 + 10 + 8 + 9 + 6 + 11
 + 11 + 10 + 10 + 11 + 7 + 5 + 5 + 11
 + 1 + 5 + 3 + 1 + 6 
 + 7 
 + 4 + 7 + 6 + 2 + 6 + 8 + 5 
 + 3 + 7 + 8 + 6 + 3 + 5 + 10
 + 5 + 13 + 12
 
 
 
 
 
}}
| top point scorer =  Warren Seals(Darlington MP)267 points
| top try scorer   =  Jake Lloyd(Blackheath) Jason Worrall(Chinnor)18 tries each
| prevseason       = 2018–19
| nextseason       = 2021–22
}}

The 2019–20 National League 1, known for sponsorship reasons as the SSE National League 1, was the 11th season of the third tier of the English rugby union system, since the professionalised format of the second tier RFU Championship was introduced; and was the 33rd season since league rugby began in 1987.

Newly promoted Canterbury were the first team to be relegated after losing away to league leaders Richmond on 29 February, with six games still to play.  Hull Ionians, also newly promoted, were the second team to be relegated after losing their rescheduled match at home to Blackheath on 14 March - Ionians having six games still to play.  

Due to the COVID-19 pandemic in the United Kingdom the Rugby Football Union officially cancelled the season after an initially suspension of all rugby in England including training, from which was scheduled to last until 14 April 2020.  After the cancellation was announced the RFU used a best playing record formula to decide the final table.  This meant that Richmond, who had been 7 points clear when the league had been suspended, were crowned as champions, beating off stiff opposition from Rosslyn Park (who beat Richmond home and away) and newly promoted Rams, who had a fantastic debut season in the third tier.  Richmond's title was their third at level 3, and tied them with Coventry and Otley as the clubs that had the most league titles.  It also was the fourth time Richmond had been promoted from tier 3 - a divisional record.    

With two relegation spots already decided, it was tough luck for Rotherham Titans who were designated as the third team to go down, despite a late surge which had seen them gaining ground on 13th placed Birmingham Moseley.  It was also a great fall for a side that were once playing in the Premiership and the lowest level for the club since the mid 1990s.  Richmond would return to the 2020–21 RFU Championship after one season away, while Rotherham Titans and Hull Ionians would relegated to 2021–22 National League North and Canterbury to 2021–22 National League South.

Another interesting statistic from the season was Brandon Asher-Wood's 7 tries for Darlington Mowden Park's resounding win against Hull Ionians on 21 December 2019.  Wood's tries equalled the league record of 7 previously set by Hugo Ellis of Rosslyn Park back in the 2012–13 season.

Structure
The league consists of sixteen teams with all the teams playing each other on a home and away basis to make a total of thirty matches each. There is one promotion place with the champions promoted to the Greene King IPA Championship. There are usually three relegation places with the bottom three teams relegated to either National League 2 North or National League 2 South depending on the geographical location of the team.

The results of the matches contribute points to the league as follows:
 4 points are awarded for a win
 2 points are awarded for a draw
 0 points are awarded for a loss, however
 1 losing (bonus) point is awarded to a team that loses a match by 7 points or fewer
 1 additional (bonus) point is awarded to a team scoring 4 tries or more in a match.

Participating teams and locations
Twelve of the sixteen teams participated in the preceding season's competition. The 2018–19 champions, Ampthill, were promoted to the 2019–20 RFU Championship, swapping places with bottom club, Richmond, who were relegated from the 2018–19 RFU Championship. Sides relegated from the 2018–19 National League 1 were Loughborough Students, Esher and Caldy.

The teams promoted into the division were Hull Ionians and Rams, champions of 2018–19 National League 2 North and 2018–19 National League 2 South respectively, along with the south runners-up Canterbury, who defeated the north's Chester in the promotion play-off. Ionians return to the division after a season's absence, while Rams and Canterbury are debuting in National 1 – the highest level either club have reached since the leagues began.

Tables

At the date the leagues were suspended, the National League 1 table read as follows:

On 4 April, the RFU confirmed the final table for the season.

Fixtures & results

Round 1

Round 2

Round 3

Round 4

Round 5

Round 6

Round 7

Round 8

Postponed due to adverse weather conditions (wind/rain).  Game to be rescheduled for 22 February 2020.

Round 9

Round 10

Round 11

Round 12

Round 13

Round 14

Round 15

Round 16

Round 17

Round 18

Round 19

Game postponed due to the funeral of Hull Ionians player, Billy Hardy, who died on 28 December 2019 after falling ill following a gym workout.  Game to be rescheduled for 14 March 2020.

Round 20

Round 21

Round 22

Round 23 

Postponed.  Game to be rescheduled for 14 March 2020.

Postponed.  Game to be rescheduled for 22 February 2020.

Postponed.  Game to be rescheduled for 22 February 2020.

Rounds 8 & 23 (rescheduled games)

Game rescheduled from 15 February 2020.

Game originally rescheduled from 15 February 2020 but postponed again due to poor weather.  Game to be rescheduled for 12 March 2020.

Game rescheduled from 26 October 2019 but postponed again due to poor weather.  Game to be rescheduled for 11 April 2020.

Round 24 

Postponed due to bad weather.  Game to be rescheduled for 2 May 2020.

Canterbury are relegated.

Round 25

Rounds 19 & 23 (rescheduled games) 

Game originally rescheduled from 15 February 2020 and then again from 22 February 2020.

Game rescheduled from 18 January 2020.  Hull Ionians are relegated.

Game rescheduled from 15 February 2020.

Round 26

Round 27

Round 28

Round 8 (rescheduled game) 

Game rescheduled from 26 October 2019 and then 22 February 2020.

Round 29

Round 30

Round 24 (rescheduled game)

Game rescheduled from 29 February 2020.

Attendances

Individual statistics
 Note that points scorers includes tries as well as conversions, penalties and drop goals. Appearance figures also include coming on as substitutes (unused substitutes not included).

Top points scorers

Top try scorers

Season records

Team
Largest home win — 85 points
92 – 7 Darlington Mowden Park at home to Hull Ionians on 21 December 2019
Largest away win — 50 points
50 – 0 Richmond away to Canterbury on 9 November 2019
Most points scored — 92
92 – 7 Darlington Mowden Park at home to Hull Ionians on 21 December 2019
Most tries in a match — 14
Darlington Mowden Park at home to Hull Ionians on 21 December 2019
Richmond at home to Hull Ionians on 11 January 2020
Most conversions in a match — 11
Darlington Mowden Park at home to Hull Ionians on 21 December 2019
Most penalties in a match — 5 (6)
Old Elthamians at home to Plymouth Albion on 28 September 2019
Birmingham Moseley at home to Sale FC on 2 November 2019
Rosslyn Park at home to Chinnor on 9 November 2019
Birmingham Moseley at home to Rams on 21 December 2019
Sale FC away to Blackheath on 25 January 2020
Blackheath at home to Plymouth Albion on 8 February 2020
Most drop goals in a match — 1 (3)
Plymouth Albion at home to Canterbury on 5 October 2019
Sale FC at home to Rosslyn Park on 5 October 2019
Bishop's Stortford at home to Rams on 26 October 2019

Attendances
Highest — 2,000
Rosslyn Park at home to Richmond on 6 March 2020
Lowest — 145
Cinderford at home to Blackheath on 7 March 2020
Highest average attendance — 1,005		
Plymouth Albion
Lowest average attendance — 245	
Hull Ionians

Player
Most points in a match — 35
 Brandon Asher-Wood for Darlington Mowden Park at home to Hull Ionians on 21 December 2019
Most tries in a match — 7
 Brandon Asher-Wood for Darlington Mowden Park at home to Hull Ionians on 21 December 2019
Most conversions in a match — 9
 Warren Seals for Darlington Mowden Park at home to Birmingham Moseley on 30 November 2019
Most penalties in a match — 5 (6)
 Tom White for Old Elthamians at home to Plymouth Albion on 28 September 2019
 Clifford Hodgson for Birmingham Moseley at home to Sale FC on 2 November 2019
 Craig Holland for Rosslyn Park at home to Chinnor on 9 November 2019
 Clifford Hodgson for Birmingham Moseley at home to Rams on 21 December 2019
 Chris Johnson for Sale FC away to Blackheath on 25 January 2020
 Mark Cooke for Blackheath at home to Plymouth Albion on 8 February 2020
Most drop goals in a match — 1 (3)
 Connor Eastgate for Plymouth Albion at home to Canterbury on 5 October 2019
 Chris Johnson for Sale FC at home to Rosslyn Park on 5 October 2019
 Bradley Burr for Bishop's Stortford at home to Rams on 26 October 2019

Notes

See also
 2019–20 National League 2 North
 2019–20 National League 2 South
 English rugby union system
 Rugby union in England

References

External links
 NCA Rugby

3
National League 1 seasons
National League 1